On 1 September 1953, an Air France Lockheed L-749 Constellation, registered in France as F-BAZZ, flying Flight 178, a scheduled flight from Paris to Nice, crashed into the Pelat Massif in the French Alps near Barcelonnette on the first stage of the flight, between Orly Airport and Nice Airport. All 42 on board were killed, nine crew and 33 passengers including the French violinist Jacques Thibaud and the French pianist René Herbin.

Accident
The Constellation had left Orly at 22:00 and was due at Nice at 23:55. At 23:25 the aircraft requested permission to descend from 13,600 ft (4 145 m) to 11,500 ft (3 505 m) and reported violent local storms.

A rescue party from Fours left about 90 minutes after the accident but did not arrive at the scene until 5:25, they were joined by a doctor and nurse from Barcelonnette and two teams from the Chasseurs Alpins. The Chasseurs Alpins were equipped with radio and reported at 6:45 that no survivors had been found.

The accident investigation established "controlled flight into terrain (CFIT)" as the cause.

Passengers
The aircraft had 33 passengers, 30 bound for Saigon and three for Beirut. Three of the passengers were the 72-year-old French violinist Jacques Thibaud, his daughter-in-law and his accompanist. Thibaud's 1720 Stradivarius violin, "Thibaud", was also destroyed in the crash.

Aircraft
The aircraft was a four-engined Lockheed L-749 Constellation piston-engined airliner registered F-BAZZ, construction number 2674, that had first flown in 1951 in the United States and had been delivered to Air France on 18 July 1951.

See also

References

Notes

Bibliography

External links
 Aviation Safety Network report
 Photos of the accident site in 2009

Aviation accidents and incidents in 1953
Aviation accidents and incidents in France
Accidents and incidents involving the Lockheed Constellation
Aviation accidents and incidents involving controlled flight into terrain
178
1953 in France
History of the Alps